Parastrachia is a genus of true bugs belonging to the family Parastrachiidae. It was established in 1883 by the English entomologist William Lucas Distant. It consists of only two species from Eastern Asia, Parastrachia japonensis and Parastrachia nagaensis. Like other members of the family, they exhibit maternal care of eggs.

References

Pentatomomorpha genera
Fauna of East Asia